Carlos Henrique Schroder (born January 8, 1959) is a Brazilian journalist and chief executive officer (CEO) of TV Globo.

Schroder began working at TV Globo in 1982 as a producer. He held several positions in journalism, until he was appointed director of Central Globo de Jornalismo (CGJ) in 2001 and in 2009, director-general of the Journalism and Sports department. In 2012, he took over as the company's CEO.

References

External links
Biography in Memória Globo

1959 births
People from Rio Grande do Sul
Brazilian television executives
Brazilian chief executives
Brazilian people of German descent
Living people